The men's sabre was one of seven fencing events on the Fencing at the 1924 Summer Olympics programme. It was the seventh appearance of the event, the only fencing event to have been on the programme at every Games. The competition was held from Tuesday July 16, 1924 to Thursday July 18, 1924. 47 fencers from 15 nations competed. Nations were limited to four fencers each, down from eight in 1920. The event was won by Sándor Pósta of Hungary, beginning a nine-Games streak in which Hungarians won the gold medal in the men's sabre (and was the third of eleven straight Games in which Hungary competed that a Hungarian won, with Hungary excluded from the 1920 competition). Roger Ducret of France took silver, while another Hungarian—János Garay—earned bronze.

Italian Oreste Puliti was disqualified when the other Italian fencers in the final were accused of conspiring to lose to him in order to inflate his score. This led to Puliti assaulting or threatening to assault a Hungarian judge, Gyorgy Kovacs, and 4 months later the two duelled with real swords. The duel ended in a draw.

Background

This was the seventh appearance of the event, which is the only fencing event to have been held at every Summer Olympics. Four of the twelve finalists from 1920 returned: bronze medalist Adrianus de Jong of the Netherlands, fourth-place finisher Oreste Puliti of Italy, fifth-place finisher Jan van der Wiel of the Netherlands, and eighth-place finisher Robin Dalglish of Great Britain. De Jong had won the first two world championships in 1922 and 1923. Ivan Osiier of Denmark, in his fourth Olympics of seven in which he would compete, entered the sabre for the first time. The Hungarian team, which had claimed five of the six possible medals in 1908 and 1912 before being uninvited to the 1920 Games after World War I, returned to competition. Hungary was favored with multiple excellent fencers, but de Jong and Puliti were also strong contenders.

Argentina, Chile, Norway, Turkey, and Uruguay each made their debut in the men's sabre. Italy and Denmark each made their fifth appearance in the event, tied for most of any nation.

Competition format

The event used a three-round format. In each round, the fencers were divided into pools to play a round-robin within the pool. Bouts were to four touches. Standard sabre rules applied.
 Quarterfinals: There were 7 pools of between 6 and 8 fencers each. The top 4 fencers in each quarterfinal advanced to the semifinals.
 Semifinals: There were 3 pools of 9 or 10 fencers each. The top 4 fencers in each semifinal advanced to the final.
 Final: The final pool had 12 fencers.

Schedule

Results

Quarterfinals

The top four fencers in each pool advanced. Bouts were to four touches. Bout record was the primary determiner of rank; ties were broken first by the number of times touched, then by touches scored, and then by a tiebreaker pool if the fencers were still tied.

Quarterfinal A

Quarterfinal B

Sola beat Kershaw 4–2 in the tiebreaker.

Quarterfinal C

Quarterfinal D

Quarterfinal E

Quarterfinal F

Quarterfinal G

Semifinals

The top four fencers in each pool advanced. Bouts were to four touches. Bout record was the primary determiner of rank; ties were broken first by the number of times touched, then by touches scored, and then by a tiebreaker pool if the fencers were still tied.

Semifinal A

Semifinal B

Semifinal C

Final

Hungarian judge György Kovács ruled that the three Italian teammates of Oreste Puliti had thrown their matches to Puliti. Puliti responded by threatening Kovács, resulting in his disqualification. The other Italians then withdrew in protest, leaving only eight of the scheduled 12 finalists.

There were three separate tie-breaker barrages used, involving seven of the eight fencers: a sixth/seventh place match, a fourth/fifth place match, and a three-way match to determine the medals. 

 Barrages

References

 
 

Sabre men
Men's events at the 1924 Summer Olympics